The Vandal conquest of Roman Africa, also known as the Vandal conquest of North Africa was the conquest of Mauretania Tingitana, Mauretania Caesariensis, and Africa Proconsolaris by the migrating Vandals and Alans. The conflict lasted 13 years with a period of four years of peace, and led to the establishment of the Vandal Kingdom in 435.

Background 
The Roman Empire had been in a state of decline by the beginning of the fourth century, and divided into two since 395. During this time, North Africa had remained relatively stable, although beginning in the third and fourth century various Nomadic Berber, mainly Gaetuli, tribes from the Sahara had executed increasing pressure on the Roman provinces in Northwest Africa, often occupying parts of it, and weakening Roman rule over the region, although the fertile heartlands had remained under stable Roman rule throughout. Meanwhile, starting in the late third century, the Romans had come increasingly into conflicts with the migrating Vandals, and East Germanic tribes, speaking the Vandalic language, also an East Germanic language. In 405 the Vandals crossed the Rhine along with various other Germanic tribes, and devastated Gaul. Crossing through the Pyrenees in 409, the Vandals first settled along with the Iranic Alans as Roman foederati in the region of Asturias, and some of the Silingi Vandals in the region of Hispania Baetica. In 419 the Vandals and Alans were defeated by the allied forces of the Western Roman Empire and the Suebi at the battle of the Nervasos Mountains, forcing the Vandals and Alans to migrate to abandon their territories, and their king, Gunderic, to flee to Baetica. In 422 Vandalic king Gunderic defeated the Romans at the Battle of Tarraco, and in 425 proceeded to sack much of Hispania. In 428 Gunderic died, and was succeeded by Geiseric, who possibly at the invitation of Bonifatius, Roman governor of the region, crossed into Africa.

The invasion 
The invasion began in 429, and the Vandals first set foot on the continent in modern day Morocco, Tingi, and crossing the Strait of Gibraltar. From there they rapidly swept east, defeating any resistance the weakened Roman army in the region could set up. Bonifatius, immediately started amassing an army to push them back (this contradicts the claim of later writer Jordanes who claimed that Bonifatius invited the Vandals). By 430 the Vandals had taken everything in Mauretania and started pushing into the region of Numidia. There, Bonifatius confronted the vandals at the Battle of Calama, where the Vandals inflicted a severe defeat on him, after which the Vandals pushed to the boundaries of modern Algeria and began the siege of Hippo Regius, during which famous Christian saint Augustine of Hippo would die, probably succumbing to an illness. After 14 months of siege, the Vandals would be forced to lift the siege thanks to the attack of Bonifatius, now reinforced by Eastern Roman contingents led by Aspar. In 432 Bonifatius left for Rome where he was appointed Magister militum of the western armies, a position which he wanted to use to retake Africa, his power base for nearly a decade by that point. After leaving Africa, Bonifatius would soon die at the hand of his rival Flavius Aetius at the battle of Rimini. In 432, Aspar was yet again defeated in the region of Hippo Regius, where according to some sources Marcian, future emperor of Rome, was caught by the Vandals. Despite this, a sort of stalemate formed in the region, and in 435 the Vandals signed a peace treaty with the Romans, agreeing to be Foederati in turn for seizing all of Mauretania Tingitana, Mauretania Caesariensis, and Numidia. The Vandals throughout the 6 years of war destroyed Altava (which was later rebuilt, and established as the capital of the Berber Kingdom of Altava), and devastated Tasacora, Portus Magnus, Thagaste, Sicca Veneria, Cartennae, Caesarea, Icosium, Auzia, Sitifis, Cirta, Calama, Thuburbo Majus, and Rusadir. In turn for the peace, Geiseric also had to give up Huneric, his son, to the romans as a hostage for a short period of time. The peace did not last for long, and in 439 the Vandals attacked Carthage without a declaration of war, and took the city without any resistance. The conquest did not stop, as naval war ensued between the Vandals and the Western Romans, although this would end after the Vandals landed armies in Sicily and signed a peace treaty with the Vandals in 442.

References 

Carthage
Carthage
Carthage
Military history of Tunisia
Theodosius II
440s conflicts
Wars involving the Roman Empire
Battles involving the Alans
Military history of Algeria